Sradha is a 2000 Indian Malayalam language action film directed by I. V. Sasi and written by T. Damodaran and Dr. Rajendrababu. The film stars Mohanlal, Arun Pandian, Abhirami, Sangeetha, Shobhana and Indraja. It features a musical score and soundtrack composed by Bharadwaj. The plot follows the investigations of a police squad led by Ganga Prasad (Mohanlal) for a terrorist threat in the city. The film was released on 7 July 2000, and ended up as a critical and commercial failure. It was dubbed and released in Tamil titled Dhool Police and in Telugu as Abhi.

Plot
Ganga Prasad IPS (Mohanlal) is a police officer of the Anti Terrorist Wing of the State Police. He has a wife, Suma (Shobhana) and son Abi. A girl Swapna (Abhirami), who is attracted to Prasad, falls in love with him. Meanwhile, a group of hard-core terrorists led by Lucifer Munna (Arun Pandian) and Janeesha (Sangeetha) wreak havoc at various parts of the city. How Gangaprasad resolves the terrorist attack forms the climax of the movie.

Cast

Mohanlal as Gangaprasad IPS, Director-Anti Terrorist Wing
Arun Pandian as Dr. Lucifer Munna
Abhirami as Swapna
Sangeetha as Janeesha
Shobhana as Suma Gangaprasad
Indraja as C.I Sudha
Seema as Nandhini Balachandran, Family friend of Gangaprasad, who conducts a play school for children
Vijayakumar as Narendran IPS, Anti Terrorist Wing officer
Devan as Dr. Balachandran
Kozhikode Narayanan Nair as Sukumaran, Ganga Prasad's father
Janardhanan as Ayyappan, Swapna's father
Kunchan as Chandrappan
Mayuri Kango
V. K. Sreeraman as Jayadevan IPS Commissioner of Police
Spadikam George as DGP Karunakaran
Major Ravi as Aravindakshan, IB Officer
Reshmi Soman as Beena
Anu Anand as Shaju
Bindu Ramakrishnan as Ganga Prasad's mother
Lekshmi Rattan
Sidharaj as S.P Rajashekharan IPS
Yamuna as SI
Mini Agustine

Soundtrack
The soundtrack was composed by Bharadwaj and released by the label Satyam Audios.

References

External links
 
 Malayalachalachithram.com
 Malayalasangeetham.com

2000 films
2000s Malayalam-language films
Indian action thriller films
Films about terrorism in India
Indian police films
Films scored by Bharadwaj (composer)
Fictional portrayals of the Kerala Police
Films shot in Kochi
2000 action thriller films
2000s police films
Films directed by I. V. Sasi